Sergey Aleksandrovich Savin (born 7 October 1988) is a Russian volleyball player, a member of Russia men's national volleyball team and Russian club Lokomotiv Novosibirsk.

Career
In season 2013/14 he won with his Russian team Guberniya Nizhniy Novgorod the silver medal at the CEV Cup.

Sporting achievements

Clubs

CEV Cup
  2013/2014 - with Guberniya Nizhniy Novgorod

References

1988 births
Living people
Russian men's volleyball players
Place of birth missing (living people)
Universiade medalists in volleyball
Universiade gold medalists for Russia
Medalists at the 2013 Summer Universiade
Tyumen State University alumni